Spencer Cox may refer to:

Spencer Cox (activist) (1968–2012), HIV/AIDS activist
Spencer Cox (politician) (born 1975), Utah politician